A council is a group of people who come together to consult, deliberate, or make decisions. A council may function as a legislature, especially at a town, city or county/shire level, but most legislative bodies at the state/provincial or national level are not considered councils. At such levels, there may be no separate executive branch, and the council may effectively represent the entire government. A board of directors might also be denoted as a council. A committee might also be denoted as a council, though a committee is generally a subordinate body composed of members of a larger body, while a council may not be. Because many schools have a student council, the council is the form of governance with which many people are likely to have their first experience as electors or participants.

A member of a council may be referred to as a councillor or councilperson, or by the gender-specific titles of councilman and councilwoman.

In politics
Notable examples of types of councils encountered in politics include:

 Borough council, a form of local government
 Catholic Ecumenical Councils, ecclesiastical gatherings for ordering the Catholic Church
 City council, a form of local government
 Community council, the most local official representative body in Scotland and in Wales
 Council of Europe, a political, intergovernmental organization with 47 member countries
 Council of the European Union, the upper house of the European Union
 Council of State, an organ of government in many states
 County council, a council that governs a county in the British Isles
 District council, a unit of government in various jurisdictions
 Ecumenical Councils, pan-Christian discussion bodies
 European Council, the body of heads of states or of governments of the European Union
 Labour council, an association of labour unions or union branches in a given area
 Municipal council, a form of local government
 National security council, an executive-branch governmental body responsible for coordinating policy on national security issues
 Parish councils in England, a form of local government in part of the United Kingdom
 Privy council, a body that advises the head of state of a country
 Provincial council, a governing body for a province
 Regional council, a local-government body in various countries
 Shire Council, an entity of local government in Australia
 Shura Council, the formerly upper house of the Egyptian parliament.
 Town council, a democratically elected form of government for small municipalities or parishes
 Tribal Council, First Nations' and Native American Nations' governing bodies
 UK Research Councils, government agencies responsible for an area of research in the United Kingdom
 United Nations Security Council, a decision-making body at the United Nations
 Vatican Council, a high-level policy-council of the Roman Catholic Church
 Village council (Palestinian Authority), a local-government body in Palestine
 Workers' council, a council composed of working-class or proletarian members

In other fields
Types of councils encountered in other spheres include:
 Arts council, a government or private, non-profit organization dedicated to promoting the arts
 Bar council, a professional body that regulates the profession of barristers together with the Inns of Court
 Buddhist councils, important historical events in the history of Buddhism
 Council (Boy Scouts), a non-profit private corporation within Boy Scouts of America
 Ecumenical council, a meeting of the bishops of the whole church convened to discuss and settle matters of Church doctrine and practice
 Military council
 Student council, a student organization present in many elementary schools, middle schools, high schools, colleges and universities
 Synod in a Christian church
 University Council running a university
 War Council, discussions pertaining to a declaration of war, or tactics and strategy of a coming battle
 Works council,  a body representing the workers of a plant, factory, etc., elected to negotiate with the management about working conditions, wages, etc.
 Youth council, an example of youth voice engaged in youth-led decision-making

See also

Articles
 Consul
 Legislative Council
 Pontifical Council
 Local government in Australia
 United Nations Security Council
Directorial system a form is government where a group of people act as the head of State and/or Government.

Disambiguation pages

Accreditation Council
Advisory Council
Affairs Council
American Council
Australian Council
Canadian Council
Christian Council
Common Council
Cooperation Council
Council High School
Council house
Council of Elders
Crown Council
Dance Council
Danish Council
Defence Council
Dental Council
District council
Dutch Council
European Council
Examinations Council
Executive Council
Federal Council
Federation Council
French Council
Funding Council
General council
General Teaching Council
Grand Council
High Council
Hong Kong Council
Indian Council
International Council
Iraqi Council
Local Council
Medical Council
Military Council
Muslim Council
National Council
Olympic Council
Policy Council
Polish Council
Press Council
Regional Council
Restoration Council
Revolutionary Council
Scottish Council
State Council
Supreme Council
The Council
Valley Council
Vietnamese Council
World Council

External links

Deliberative groups
Legislatures

ja:評議会
ko:평의회